"Attention Attention" is a song by American rock band Shinedown. It was the fourth and final single off of their sixth studio album Attention Attention. It reached the top of the Billboard Mainstream Rock Songs chart in January 2020. It also reached number 30 on the Billboard Hot Rock & Alternative Songs chart in January 2020.

Background
The song was released on September 24, 2019, as the fourth single from the band's sixth studio album, Attention Attention. An accompanying music video was released on the same day.

Themes and composition
Attention Attention is a concept album, that, from beginning to end of the album, "charts the life of an individual protagonist from excruciating lows to searing highs", with the track appearing in the first half of the album. While discussing the track Smith stated: 

The song has rap-styled verses along with a melodic chorus.

Personnel
Adapted from the album's liner notes.

Shinedown
 Brent Smith – lead vocals
 Zach Myers – lead guitar, backing vocals
 Eric Bass – bass, backing vocals
 Barry Kerch – drums

Additional personnel
 Eric Bass – production, mixing, engineering
 Doug McKean – engineering
 Eric Rickert – engineering
 Mike  Fasano  – drum tech
 HooGie J Donais – guitar tech
 Ted Jensen – mastering

Charts

References

American rock songs